The following is a list of California Golden Bears softball seasons. The University of California, Berkeley is a member of the Pac-12 Conference of the NCAA Division I.  The Golden Bears have won seven conference championships, appeared in the NCAA Division I softball tournament 32 times, and in the Women's College World Series 15 times, including three under the authority of the AIAW.  The Bears won the National Championship in 2002, and appeared in the finals twice more.

References

California
California Golden Bears softball